"Love's Taken Over" is the lead single from Chanté Moore's debut album, Precious. The song is R&B and one of Moore's biggest R&B hits to date, peaking at number thirteen on the US Billboard Hot R&B Singles chart, spending 33 weeks on the listing.

Music video
The song's music video was directed by Antoine Fuqua.

Charts

Release history

References

1992 songs
1992 debut singles
Chanté Moore songs
MCA Records singles
Music videos directed by Antoine Fuqua
Silas Records singles
Songs written by Chanté Moore
Songs written by Simon Law